The Indian Red Cross Society (IRCS) is a voluntary humanitarian organization to protect human life and health based in India. It is part of the International Red Cross and Red Crescent Movement and shares the Fundamental Principles of the International Red Cross and Red Crescent Movement. The society's mission is to provide relief in times of disasters/emergencies and promote health and care of vulnerable people and communities. It has a network of over 700 branches throughout India. The Society uses the Red Cross as an emblem in common with other international Red Cross societies. Volunteering has been at the very heart of the Indian Red Cross Society since its inception in 1920, with the Society having Youth and Junior volunteering programmes. The Society is closely associated with St John Ambulance India.

History

During the First World War relief services for affected soldiers in India was provided by a branch of the Joint War Committee, a collaboration between the St John Ambulance  Association and the British Red Cross. On 3 March 1920, a bill was introduced to the Indian Legislative Council by Sir Claude Hill (a member of the Viceroy's Executive Council who was also Chairman of the Joint War Committee in India) to constitute the Indian Red Cross Society, independent of the British Red Cross. The Bill was passed as the Indian Red Cross Society Act, 1920 on 17 March 1920, and became Parliament Act XV of 1920 with the assent of the Governor General on the 20 March 1920.

On 7 June 1920 fifty members were formally nominated to constitute the Indian Red Cross Society from members of the Indian branch of the Joint War Committee. The first managing body was elected from among them with Sir William Malcolm Hailey as chairman.

Red Cross parcels

PoW parcels supplied by the Indian Red Cross Society during WW2 contained:

 8 ounces fruit in syrup
 16 ounces lentils
 2 ounces toilet soap
 16 ounces flour
 8 biscuits
 8 ounces margarine
 12 ounces Nestlé's Milk
 14 ounces rice
 16 ounces pilchards
 2 ounces curry powder
 8 ounces sugar
 1 ounce dried eggs
 2 ounces tea
 1 ounce salt
 4 ounces chocolate

Post War

In 1947 some of the IRCS assets were provided to found the Pakistan Red Cross Order, now the Pakistan Red Crescent Society.

The act governing the IRCS was last amended by The Indian Red Cross Society (Amendment) Bill, 1992.

Organisation
 The IRCS has 35 state / union territories branches with their more than 700 districts and sub district branches.

  India is the president of the IRCS
 The Minister of Health and Family Welfare is the chairman of the society.
 The National Managing Body consists of 19 members.
 The chairman and 6 members of the managing body are nominated by the president. The remaining 12 are elected by the state and union territory branches through an electoral college.
 The vice chairman is elected by the members of the managing body.
 The managing body is responsible for governance and supervision of the functions of the  society through a number of committees.
 The secretary general is the chief executive of the society.

List of secretaries general of the Indian Red Cross Society

See also
 List of Red Cross and Red Crescent Societies
 International Red Cross and Red Crescent Movement
 International Federation of Red Cross and Red Crescent Societies
 Emblems of the International Red Cross and Red Crescent Movement
 Johanniter International

References

External links
 

Red Cross and Red Crescent national societies
Charities based in India
Medical and health organisations based in India
Organizations established in 1920
1920 establishments in India